Events during the year 1167 in Italy.

Events 
 Battle of Monte Porzio - The Battle of Monte Porzio or Battle of Tusculum was fought on 29 May 1167, Whit Sunday, between the Holy Roman Empire and the city of Rome between a small hill outside the city of Tusculum and the city walls, at a place called "Prataporci", about 15 miles southeast of Rome. In the historical book Chronica Universalis, Sicardo wrote about the site of battle:...apud Montem Portium.
The army of the "Commune of Rome", called the "greatest army which Rome had sent into the field in centuries" was defeated by the forces of the Holy Roman Emperor Frederick Barbarossa and the local princes of Tusculum and Albano.

Deaths
 Avraham Ibn Ezra (c.1093–1167) - poet
 Rainald of Dassel (1120–1167) - archbishop of Cologne, archchancellor of Italy

References

Years of the 12th century in Italy
Italy
Italy